Cycas pruinosa is a small to medium species of cycad, a palm-like seed plant. It is a widespread but sporadic species in the eastern and southern Kimberley region of Western Australia, occurring also in the Spirit Hills on Bullo River Station in the Northern Territory.

This species is distinguished by its narrow, glabrous leaflets with strongly recurved margins; its long, slender microsporangiate cones; and its long megasporophylls with long, sterile apices. Glaucous leaf waxes may be either present or absent, causing plants to be either blue or green in overall appearance. It is suited to tropical regions which have a seasonally dry climate.

This strikingly distinctive and widespread species was only first recognised in 1978 by Australian botanist John Maconochie. The specific name, pruinosa, means "covered with powder" and aptly describes the blue-white ovules of this plant.

References

 
 Adelaide, J. (1978). "Cycas pruinrosa". Encyclopedia of Palms & Cycads. Retrieved 24 September 2017.

pruinosa
Flora of the Northern Territory
Flora of Western Australia
Cycadophyta of Australia
Endemic flora of Australia
Least concern flora of Australia